Pangio alcoides is a species of ray-finned fish in the genus Pangio.

Footnotes

References

Pangio
Fish described in 1993